Mbire District is a district of the Province Mashonaland Central in Zimbabwe.

References

Districts of Mashonaland Central Province